

The Focke-Wulf Project II was a design study for a single-seat jet fighter, carried out in Germany during World War II.

Development
Owing to manufacturing difficulties envisaged with other all-new jet fighter developments, Focke-Wulf's second design was nothing more than a development of the Focke-Wulf Fw 190, but powered with a jet engine, positioned on a redesigned fuselage. This engine, a Jumo 004, was to be housed beneath the nose. A conventional undercarriage was used. The low position of the jet intake raised the likelihood of foreign matter being sucked up, and in any case, the engine would burn the runway. This design development ceased in March 1943.

Specifications (as designed)

See also

References

External links

Abandoned military aircraft projects of Germany
Project II
Single-engined jet aircraft
Low-wing aircraft